Fort Randall Dam is a  earthen dam which spans the Missouri River and impounds Lake Francis Case, the 11th-largest reservoir in the U.S. The dam joins Gregory and Charles Mix counties, South Dakota a distance of 880 river miles (1,416 km) upstream of St. Louis, Missouri, where the river joins the Mississippi River. The dam and hydroelectric power plant were constructed by and are currently operated by the U.S. Army Corps of Engineers.

History & background
Fort Randall Dam was authorized by the Flood Control Act of 1944 and plays a key role in the Pick–Sloan Plan for development of water resources in the Missouri River basin. The U.S. Army Corps of Engineers began construction of the dam in 1946, and was the first Pick-Sloan dam completed by the Omaha District. President Dwight D. Eisenhower threw the switch that started the first power generating unit in 1954. When completed in 1956, Fort Randall Dam and the Lake Francis Case Project cost approximately $200 million. U.S. Route 18 and U.S. Route 281 cross the crest of the dam.

The Fort Randall Dam is located within sight of its namesake Fort Randall, an early U.S. Army Frontier Post. Fort Randall Dam is one of six Missouri River mainstem dams, the next dam upstream is Big Bend Dam, near Ft. Thompson and the next dam downstream is Gavins Point Dam, near Yankton.

Hydroelectric Power
The eight generating units of the Fort Randall Dam are capable of generating 40 megawatts of electricity each, with an annual production of 1.727 billion kilowatt-hours. The combined maximum capacity of 320 megawatts is enough to supply 245,000 households, according to the Corps of Engineers.

2011 Missouri River flood

Visitor Center
The Fort Randall Visitor Center is located on the western edge of Pickstown, South Dakota along U.S. Highway 281 and 18. Open from Memorial Day through Labor Day, the visitor center offers a view of Fort Randall Dam, Lake Francis Case and the Missouri River. Exhibits highlight the dam's construction, area natural and cultural history and paleontology. There is also a freshwater aquarium with fish species found in the Missouri River.

See also
Lake Francis Case
Missouri National Recreational River
Pick–Sloan Missouri Basin Program
Pickstown, South Dakota
List of crossings of the Missouri River

References

External links
 
 Fort Randall Dam & Lake Francis Case - U.S. Army Corps of Engineers

Buildings and structures in Charles Mix County, South Dakota
Dams in South Dakota
Buildings and structures in Gregory County, South Dakota
Dams on the Missouri River
Hydroelectric power plants in South Dakota
United States Army Corps of Engineers dams
Dams completed in 1956
Energy infrastructure completed in 1956
Earth-filled dams
Tourist attractions in Charles Mix County, South Dakota
U.S. Route 18
U.S. Route 81